Cape Breton is a community located in Westmorland County, New Brunswick, Canada. The community is situated in southeastern New Brunswick, to the north-east of Moncton.

History

Notable people

See also
List of communities in New Brunswick

References

Bordering communities

Communities in Westmorland County, New Brunswick
Communities in Greater Moncton